Sándor Torghelle (born 5 May 1982) is a Hungarian former professional footballer who played as a forward. During his career, he played for Honvéd, Marcali, Crystal Palace, Panathinaikos, PAOK, Carl Zeiss Jena, FC Augsburg, Fortuna Düsseldorf, Videoton, and Vasas. He played 42 games for the Hungary national team between 2004 and 2010.

Club career

Crystal Palace
After developing in Hungary and playing for Budapest Honvéd, Marcali VFC and MTK Hungária, Torghelle signed for Crystal Palace, in August 2004 for a fee of roughly £750,000. He caught their eyes after scoring both goals for Hungary national team in their shock international friendly 2–0 victory over Germany in Kaiserslautern before UEFA Euro 2004. He wore the number 10 shirt, that of a first-choice striker, but found it hard to gain a regular place in the Crystal Palace starting eleven with Andy Johnson often playing as a lone striker. He scored only one goal in a League Cup match against Charlton, but the referee sent him off late in the game for diving.

After 12 months at Palace, Torghelle was first stripped of his first-team squad number (given number 30, while 10 went to new signing Jon Macken), and shortly after was loaned out to Panathinaikos in Greece for the 2005–06 season. In the deal, there was no clause for re-calling him, so he spent the whole season in Greece. However, he failed to impress, and Panathinaikos chose not to make the deal permanent.

PAOK
Torghelle was transferred to PAOK in Greece and handed a three-year contract, being one of the three players that were traded for the transfer of striker Dimitris Salpingidis.

He was also famous for his failure to score even a single goal since he was transferred from Crystal Palace, yet this "curse" was lifted when he scored in a PAOK-Olympiakos derby in early 2007. He left PAOK at the end of the 2006–07 season for 2. Bundesliga team Carl Zeiss Jena. There, he finally met the expectations, scoring eight goals over the course of the 2007–08 2. Bundesliga season. Carl Zeiss Jena finished in last place and was relegated to the new 3. Liga.

FC Augsburg
Torghelle transferred to 2. Bundesliga team FC Augsburg before the start of the 2008–09 season.  He played two seasons for the largest team in Swabian Bavaria.

Fortuna Düsseldorf
On 17 May 2010, Torghelle left FC Augsburg and signed with another 2. Bundesliga team Fortuna Düsseldorf.

Budapest Honvéd
Torghelle signed with former club Honvéd in August 2011. That reunion was short-lived and he signed for fellow Hungarian National Championship team Videoton FC in January 2012.

International career
Torghelle made 42 appearances for the Hungary national team. He scored several decisive ones during the 2010 World Cup Qualification campaign, such as against Albania and Malta. He came to prominence after scoring both goals in a 2–0 victory over Germany in a friendly match in 2004.

Career statistics

Club

International

Scores and results list Hungary's goal tally first, score column indicates score after each Torghelle goal.

References

External links
 Torghelle Sándor Profile at magyarfutball.hu
 Torghelle Sándor at FC Augsburg official site 
 Torghelle Sándor at HLSZ.hu 
 
 
 
 
 
 

1982 births
Living people
Hungarian people of German descent
Hungarian footballers
Footballers from Budapest
Association football forwards
Hungary international footballers
Budapest Honvéd FC players
Marcali VFC footballers
MTK Budapest FC players
Crystal Palace F.C. players
Panathinaikos F.C. players
PAOK FC players
FC Carl Zeiss Jena players
FC Augsburg players
Fortuna Düsseldorf players
Fehérvár FC players
Vasas SC players
Nemzeti Bajnokság I players
Premier League players
Super League Greece players
2. Bundesliga players
Nemzeti Bajnokság II players
Hungarian expatriate footballers
Expatriate footballers in England
Expatriate footballers in Greece
Expatriate footballers in Germany
Hungarian expatriate sportspeople in England
Hungarian expatriate sportspeople in Greece
Hungarian expatriate sportspeople in Germany